Vladimir Bogojević (born 20 April 1976) is a Serbian-German professional basketball coach and former player. He represented Germany basketball team internationally.

Early life 
Bogojević was born in Kraljevo, SR Serbia, SFR Yugoslavia.

Playing career 
Bogojevič started his professional career at the Gießen Flippers. There he made his breakthrough and then moved to Alba Berlin. During his time in Berlin, he was also a member of the Germany basketball team and played in 57 international games. After Berlin, Bogojević had stints in Yugoslavia, Spain, Italy, Greece and the Czech Republic where he played for RheinEnergie Köln, Partizan Belgrade and Tenerife CB, among others. During his career as a guard, Bogojević was a member of three German League championship teams and two German Cup winning teams. In 2006, he returned to Germany and signed for the Düsseldorf Magics of the ProA league the 2006–07 season. In 2007, he ended his professional career.

National team career 
Bogojević was a member of the Germany national U22 team that competed at the 1998 European Championship for Men '22 and Under' in Trapani, Italy. Over eight tournament games, he averaged 8.0 points, 4.9 rebounds and 1.1 assists per game.

Bogojević was a member of the Germany national basketball team that competed at the 1997 FIBA European Championship in Spain. Over eight tournament games, he averaged 6.6 points, 1.9 rebounds and 1.4 assists per game. He was a member of the team that competed at the 1999 FIBA European Championship in France. Over nine tournament games, he averaged 6.6 points, 2.6 rebounds and 5.2 assists per game.

Coaching career
Bogojević had coaching stints with the Kaiserslautern Braves and the Gießen 46ers.

Career achievements and awards
As player
German League champion: 3 (with Alba Berlin: 1997–98, 1998–99, 1999–2000)
German Cup winner: 2 (with Alba Berlin: 1998–99; with RheinEnergie Köln: 2003–04)

References

External links
 Player Profile at eurobasket.com
 Player Profile at realgm.com
 Player Profile at acb.com
 Player Statistics at basketball-reference.com

1976 births
Living people
Alba Berlin players
Real Betis Baloncesto players
German expatriate basketball people in Serbia
German men's basketball players
German basketball coaches
German people of Serbian descent
Giessen 46ers players
Giessen 46ers coaches
Liga ACB players
KK Partizan players
Köln 99ers players
MENT B.C. players
Sportspeople from Kraljevo
Serbian emigrants to Germany
Serbian expatriate basketball people in Germany
Serbian expatriate basketball people in Greece
Serbian expatriate basketball people in Italy
Serbian expatriate basketball people in Spain
Serbian expatriate basketball people in the Czech Republic
Serb diaspora sportspeople
Tenerife CB players
Guards (basketball)